Alyson Gabbard Wilson (born 1967) is an American statistician known for her work on Bayesian methods for reliability estimation and on military applications of statistics. She is a professor of statistics at North Carolina State University, where she is also Associate Vice Chancellor for National Security and Special Research Initiatives.

Education and career
Wilson graduated summa cum laude from Rice University in 1989. After earning a master's degree in statistics from Carnegie Mellon University in 1990, she completed a Ph.D. at Duke University in 1995. Her dissertation, Statistical Models for Shapes and Deformations, was supervised by Valen E. Johnson.

After completing her doctorate, Wilson worked in the defense industry as a statistician for four years before joining the research staff at Los Alamos National Laboratory in 1999, working on the statistical reliability of weapons. She moved to Iowa State University as an associate professor of statistics in 2008, and then moved again to the Institute for Defense Analyses in 2011. She returned to academia as an associate professor at North Carolina State University in 2011, and was promoted to full professor in 2015. In 2020 she became Associate Vice Chancellor for National Security and Special Research Initiatives at North Carolina State.

Book
With Michael S. Hamada, C. Shane Reese, and Harry F. Martz, Wilson is a co-author of the book Bayesian Reliability (Springer, 2008).

Recognition
Wilson became a Fellow of the American Statistical Association in 2008, an Elected Member of the International Statistical Institute in 2012, and a Fellow of the American Association for the Advancement of Science in 2015.

She won the Army Wilks Award of the Conference on Applied Statistics in Defense, given periodically for "a substantial contribution to statistical methodology and application relevant to national defense" (and not to be confused with the Samuel S. Wilks Memorial Award of the American Statistical Association) in 2015. In 2018 she won the Distinguished Achievement Award of the American Statistical Association Section on Statistics in Defense and National Security.

References

External links
Home page at NCSU
Personal home page

1967 births
Living people
American statisticians
Women statisticians
Rice University alumni
Carnegie Mellon University alumni
Duke University alumni
Los Alamos National Laboratory personnel
Iowa State University faculty
North Carolina State University faculty
Fellows of the American Association for the Advancement of Science
Fellows of the American Statistical Association
Elected Members of the International Statistical Institute